Heo Jin-ho (born August 8, 1963) is a South Korean film director and screenwriter.

Career
Heo Jin-ho graduated from Yonsei University with a degree in philosophy and went on to study filmmaking at the Korean Academy of Film Arts. His first steps as a film director did not go unnoticed as his first short, For Go-chul, was selected for the Vancouver International Film Festival. He later co-wrote the script of A Single Spark and Kilimanjaro. Many of his feature films, Christmas in August (shown at the Critics' Week in Cannes in 1998), One Fine Spring Day (2001), April Snow (2005), Happiness (2007) and A Good Rain Knows (2009) are variations on Hur's favorite theme: love. Film critic Kim Ji-mi says in Korean Film Observatory magazine (No. 23), Hur "shows the outstanding talent of being able to grasp the sensitive moments of the beginning and ending of a love between a man and a woman" (p. 22).

Filmography 
 1993: For Go-chul (short film) - director
 1993: To the Starry Island - assistant director
 1995: A Single Spark - screenplay, assistant director
 1998: Christmas in August - director, screenplay
 1998: City of the Rising Sun - actor
 2001: One Fine Spring Day - director, screenplay
 2001: Kilimanjaro - screenplay
 2004: Alone Together (short film from omnibus Twentidentity) - director
 2004: My New Boyfriend (short film) - director
 2005: April Snow - director, screenplay
 2007: Happiness - director, screenplay
 2009: I'm Right Here (short film from omnibus Five Senses of Eros) - director
 2009: A Good Rain Knows - director, screenplay, producer
 2012: Dangerous Liaisons - director
 2016: The Last Princess - director
 2019: Forbidden Dream - director
 2019: The Present - short film, director
 2021: The Dinner - director
 2021: Lost (TV series) - director

Theater 
 2010: A Nap - director

See also
 List of Korean film directors
 Cinema of Korea

References

External links

 
 
 
 Hur Jin-ho at the Korean Movie Database  
 허진호 (Jin-ho Hur) at Cine21  
 허진호 at Naver 

1963 births
Living people
South Korean film directors
South Korean screenwriters
Yonsei University alumni
Best Director Paeksang Arts Award (film) winners